Garra lissorhynchus (Khasi garra) is a species of ray-finned fish in the genus Garra from north-eastern India.

References 

Garra
Fish described in 1842